The 2014 Pan American Weightlifting Championships were held at the Pabellón de Halterofilia Dr. José Joaquín Puello in Santo Domingo, Dominican Republic. The event took place from May 26 to June 2, 2014.

Medal summary

Men

Women

Medal table
Ranking by Big (Total result) medals
 

Ranking by all medals: Big (Total result) and Small (Snatch and Clean & Jerk)

References
General
2014 IWF Pan American Championships Results
2014 Pan American Championships Results 

Specific

External links

Pan American Weightlifting Championships
Pan American Weightlifting Championships
Pan American Weightlifting Championships
International weightlifting competitions hosted by the Dominican Republic